Thomas Leahy (born 11 August 1964) is an Irish retired hurler who played for Kilkenny Championship club James Stephens. He played for the Kilkenny senior hurling team for a brief period, during which time he usually lined out as a forward.

References

1964 births
Living people
James Stephens hurlers
Kilkenny inter-county hurlers